Guarda Veneta is a comune (municipality) in the Province of Rovigo in the Italian region of Veneto, located about  southwest of Venice and about  south of Rovigo.  
  
Guarda Veneta borders the following municipalities: Bosaro, Crespino, Polesella, Pontecchio Polesine, Ro.

References

External links 

Cities and towns in Veneto